Tamron Hall (sometimes referred to as The Tamron Hall Show) is an American talk show hosted by American broadcast journalist Tamron Hall. Produced and distributed by Disney Media Distribution, it debuted on September 9, 2019, in first-run syndication on ABC Owned Television Stations and local stations across the United States and Canada.

On October 6, 2020, the series was renewed for a third season, which premiered on September 6, 2021. On November 8, 2021, the series was renewed for fourth and fifth seasons through 2024.

Syndication 
As of May 2022, the series airs as daytime programming on 206 markets in the United States. The series also broadcasts to the United States Armed Forces on AFN Spectrum. Canada's Global Television Network, Bounce TV and the ABC Owned Television Stations however air the show during the graveyard slot.

Production
Hall had initially announced plans to develop a talk show in July 2017.

On August 8, 2018, Hall entered into an agreement with DADT to produce the show. The show was picked up by ABC Owned Television Stations in late September 2018 and gradually expanded its clearance over the next few months, with more station groups, including Hearst Television, later picking up the show. With the show receiving coverage in 85% of the United States and 47 of the country's top 50 television markets, DADT announced on March 4, 2019, that the show would premiere on September 9, 2019. The show is expected to replace both Who Wants to Be a Millionaire (which was canceled in May 2019 after a total of 20 years on the air) and Right This Minute on ABC's owned-and-operated stations.

In January 2019, ABC Entertainment named Bill Geddie, the former longtime producer of The View was named as executive producer of the show. Talia Parkinson-Jones, co-executive producer of The Wendy Williams Show would be named co-executive producer of the show in June 2019. The show is recorded in the ABC Broadcast Center on the Upper West Side of Manhattan.

On March 13, 2020, Walt Disney Television halted on the series due to the COVID-19 pandemic. In later March, it was announced the series would return to television beginning March 30, with the show being taped from Hall's home. On March 18, it was announced that The Views executive producer, Candi Carter, would be joining the show following the departures of Geddie and Parkinson-Jones as the series' executive producer and showrunner.

On September 8, 2020, it was announced that an encore presentation of the show would air on Oprah Winfrey Network starting on September 14.
On August 20, 2021, it was announced that the show will be produced by ABC News with the start of the third season, though no changes in overall distribution will occur. On October 6, 2021, it was announced that Candi Carter would be departing the show as executive producer and showrunner. Good Morning America Weekend executive producer Quiana Burns was named as interim executive producer during the search for the new permanent executive producer. On November 8, 2021, ABC Owned Television Stations announced that the show has been renewed for fourth and fifth seasons, through 2024. In February 2022, ABC News officially named Quiana Burns as the permanent executive producer of the show after being named interim executive producer in October 2021, following the departure of former executive producer Candi Carter. On March 2, 2023, the show was renewed for a fifth season.

Episodes
Tamron Hall celebrated its 100th episode on February 11, 2020. The series celebrated the airing of its 300th episode on April 14, 2021. On May 12, 2022, the show had a celebration for series’ 500th episode.

Reception

Ratings
Since its second season premiere on Sep 14, Tamron Hall’s audience is averaging 1.2 million Total Viewers season to date, up 9% versus the same week as the debut season in Sept 2019.

Awards and nominations

References

External links

Official website

2010s American television talk shows
2019 American television series debuts
2020s American television talk shows
English-language television shows
First-run syndicated television programs in the United States
Television series by Disney–ABC Domestic Television
ABC News
Television shows filmed in New York City